Pacino Horne (born November 23, 1983 in Ypsilanti, Michigan) is a professional Canadian football defensive back who is currently a free agent. He most recently was a member of the Hamilton Tiger-Cats of the Canadian Football League. He signed as a free agent with the Toronto Argonauts on May 30, 2012. Horne was a member of the 100th Grey Cup winning team, recording a 25-yard interception return for a touchdown in that game. He also played college football for the Central Michigan Chippewas. On June 17, 2013, Horne was cut by the Argonauts. On September 3, 2013, Horne signed a practice roster agreement with the Hamilton Tiger-Cats.

On September 5, 2013, Horne left the Ticats. "Pacino wasn't ready to commit completely to being here, wants to explore another potential opportunity," said head coach Kent Austin.

References

External links
CFL profile page

1983 births
Living people
African-American players of Canadian football
American players of Canadian football
Toronto Argonauts players
Canadian football defensive backs
Sportspeople from Ypsilanti, Michigan
Central Michigan Chippewas football players
Bloomington Edge players
21st-century African-American sportspeople
20th-century African-American people